is a Japanese light novel series by Satoru Akahori. It was adapted into an OVA series in 1996 by J.C.Staff, followed by an anime television series and a sequel movie. The OVA and anime television series were licensed in North America by Central Park Media and released on DVD under their Software Sculptors label. The TV series has aired on Comcast's Anime Selects On Demand channel multiple times. The manga has not been released in North America.

Plot
Maze wakes up in her house; everything is a wreck and she has amnesia. Before she can gather what has happened a girl named Mill storms into her house, thanking her for having saved her life. She tells Maze that her house suddenly fell down from the sky and crushed Mill’s pursuers under it. However, before long they are both on the run from further pursuers who want to get their hands on Princess Mill.

When re-enforcements arrive, they are only saved when Maze discovers that she has phantom light magical powers and can summon Mills family heirloom mecha, Dulgar. However her performance with the mecha is weak; that is until the sun goes down and she is turned in to a lecherous man who can even handle one of the most powerful spells ever known. Soon other travellers join them as Maze tries to protect Mill and figure out what she is doing in this fantasy world; Demi-Armor hunters Aster and Solude, both of whom are interested in Female Maze; Randy, handy guide and Exposition Fairy (quite literally as she's a tiny Winged Humanoid who usually hides in Maze's shirt when the going gets tough); and Rapier, Knight and Demi-Armour pilot of the neighbouring kingdom ruled by Mill's uncle, who joins up with the party when her kingdom falls to Jaina as well.

Maze and Mill meet more companions on their journey and become embroiled in a war to defeat Jaina and raise Mill back to the throne of Bartonia.

Characters
Female Maze (Mei Ikaruga) The heroine of the story. She accidentally saves the life of Princess Mill when her house falls on Mil's would-be murderer (much as in The Wonderful Wizard of Oz) upon falling into the fantasy world. After that she becomes extremely protective of Mill, who often shows intimate feelings or sexual advances toward Maze. She is a natural pacifist when the story begins. She has considerable magical ability but initially is much less effective at using them while a female. Maze is a fusion of Mei and her brother Akira who switch places at daybreak and nightfall. During the day Mei is dominant, while at night Akira is. Maze was brought from the real world as the Eraser to correct an imbalance.

Male Maze (Akira Ikaruga) At night, Maze turns into a male with a distinct personality from the daytime female form. He loves to fight, to the horror of the female form, who can be seen trapped in his head shouting at him wherever he tries to fight. In male form, he has vastly increased magical powers. He is very sexually predatory towards almost any pretty girl he meets. Like the female Maze, his memories are mostly wiped or jumbled upon leaving the real world, though they start to recover over time. He is initially portrayed as a sex crazed, violent monster with little personality, but in time his personality emerges. In the real world, he and his sister Mei shared a taboo love that led to him being outcast by their parents. In time, both halves of Maze fall in love with each other again, even though they can only meet each other physically during sunrise and sunset. At the conclusion of the TV series, they choose to not go back to the real world, as this is the only world that they can share their love. The Japanese character for "Akira" can also be read as "Mei" and thus the name "Maze" comes from the term "Meis" as in "two of Mei".

Princess Mill Varna Mill is the princess of one of the empires in the fantasy world (either Bestool or Bartonian). She is very outgoing and childish, and seems to have abandonment issues over Maze. She is obsessed with both Mazes and often outlines her plans to marry Maze (but always with the female one), have Maze's children (with the male one), etcetera. Her family was killed when the Jaina holy group took over her family's territory. She also has the power to summon Dulgar, one of the greatest Demi-Armors (equivalent of a mech) in the entire world, which only Maze has the power to pilot. In the light novels, manga, and in episode 26, 'she' is revealed to be a hermaphrodite.

"Whirlwind" Solude Schfoltzer A demi-armor hunter and also a mercenary. She fights using long, black needles, and also possesses some phantom light (equivalent to magic) power, limited only to teleportation. She is also a lesbian, and often shows her attraction to Female Maze. In episode ten, she gets into a fight with a woman from her old dojo named "Lightning Rod" Medusa, and it is somewhat clear that they were old lovers until Medusa killed the master and then tried to kill Solude. During their final battle, Medusa purposely wasted her last crossbow bolt so that Solude could kill her, the reason being her lust for power had ruined the life she could have had and the life that the two of them could have had together.

Asterote ("Aster") Reighe Solude's partner in crime and best friend. Although they are wildly different, they both enjoy a good time, a stiff drink, a beautiful woman, and have a general hate of authority, which brings them together. Aster also has a huge crush on Maze. He fights using a grossly oversized sword and is very, very strong. Aster's full name (Asterote) is the Japanese pronunciation of Astaroth.

Randy Randy is a small fairy and the first person other than Mill to befriend Maze. She meets the pair when they run into her village. She decides to join them in order to find the magical crystals representing the 5 "Forms" of Phantom Light (including diamond, ruby, emerald, and topaz). She can often be found inside (Male or Female) Maze's shirt, waiting for the moment where her wisdom will be needed.

Rapier Saris Rapier is a woman knight and a servant of Mill's uncle and aunt. For most of her life, Rapier tried to convince others (and herself) that she was not a woman. Her father wanted a son so badly that when Rapier was born, he started telling her she was a man and cut her hair very short. It was only when the king accidentally walked in on her that she was discovered to be a woman. It is hinted that Rapier showed intimate feelings for the king, going into deep remorse when the king was killed during a raid from Jaina. However, it is very likely Rapier is attracted to Man Maze, mentioning she would let him make a move on her after the Creator was finally defeated. It is also shown in the final episode credits Man Maze holding a partially undressed Rapier. Rapier is a master of the sword, able to cut down smaller Demi Armor with relative ease.

Ranchiki Ranchiki is a young boy with a multi-hued hairdo who, for most of his life, has felt an unrequited love for Gold, the prince in disguise. He is an illuminator like Maze and also a demi-armor pilot, but he is not nearly as strong or as skilled as either Maze at these tasks. In one episode, Ranchiki pilots Dulgar when Gorgeous knocks Maze unconscious, but is quickly defeated. Despite his love for Gold, he falls in love with Man Maze at first sight and will often make moves on Woman Maze just because she is Maze (often saying things such as "Given the situation, I'll settle for the woman Maze").
Voiced by: Yuka Imai (Japanese), Mirm (1st voice), and Echo (2nd voice) (English)

Dulgar The Rom Demi Armor of the Gods. Only Mill is capable of summoning it, bio-linking it to her and Maze. It is an extremely powerful Demi Armor that is controlled by either Maze, although Man Maze is the better pilot. Certain episodes of the anime suggest that Dulgar was originally created by one of Mill's ancestors, a scientist from their world's ancient prehistory, to fight against another powerful Demi Armor that had gone out of control, and destroyed their civilization.

Gorgeous A narcissistic youth of Jaina who believes beauty is the ultimate power and that everything ugly must be destroyed. He is notoriously underhanded, resorting to trickery and dealbreaking to increase his own power. During one fight with Maze, he receives a scar on his face that eventually drives him to insanity. He completely fused with the evil Demi Armor Namchi (supposedly resurrected from Hell) in order to quench his thirst for power, but was killed by Dulgar and Man Maze.

Chic Gorgeous's older brother. When Chic and Gorgeous were younger, there was a great strife and they both managed to narrowly escape with their lives. They would have died on their own, but Jaina took them in and cared for them. Chic vowed to give all he had to repay his debt to Jaina, even commits acts he full well knows are immoral or evil. Chic is often represented as moral yet misunderstood, and his character is often portrayed in a sympathetic light. Whereas Gorgeous' only goal was to gain power for himself, Chic is a genuinely noble person who fights for the wrong side. After Gorgeous is killed by Maze, Chic becomes angered and battles the female Maze to avenge his brother's death. Though Maze doesn't want to fight him, in the end, she ultimately kills Chic. His name is always mispronounced as "Chick" instead of the correct "Sheek".

The Creator The leader of Jaina and the one responsible for the death of Mill's family. The Creator is a being much like Maze, except the change from man to woman happens every few minutes. Also, the Creator's male form is a hideous old man (that resembles Emperor Palpatine from Star Wars) while the woman form is a beautiful dark haired young woman. In truth, the Creator is the ancestor to Maze, and was foretold to be destroyed by Maze, who was deemed the Eraser. In the final battle, the Creator is revealed to be part of a gigantic, monstrous Demi Armor, and absorbed Dulgar with Maze inside. But in the end, the Creator was killed by Maze once and for all.

Episodes
OVA series
  (July 24, 1996)
  (September 21, 1996)

TV series
 A Stranger Lost in Random Space
 The Strongest Lightning-Speed Couple, desu!
 Impossible to Escape. A Most Critical Situation, desu!
 The Ultimate Red-Hot Rage, desu!
 Traditional Strength, Blue Wolf, desu!
 Invincible Affection Rom Armor, desu!
 Beautiful, Brave Female Knight, desu!
 Dark Road of the Hell Labyrinth, desu!
 The Rise and Fall of Glory — The Tearful Ending, desu!
 Hurricane Flash — The Duel in the Midday, desu!
 Superficial Gorgeous Playboy, desu!
 The Best on Earth — Great Verdict, desu!
 Falling Headlong? Maze Wanders in Time, desu!
 Holy Arrival! Activate Rom Armor, desu!
 Expectant Project! Ukyo in the Hot Springs, desu!
 Eve of the Decisive Battle. Emotions Confuse, desu!
 Collision: Saint and Sinner. Maze Dies?! Desu!
 Sturm and Drang Super Teleportation, desu!
 High School Student. My Name is Mei…, desu!
 Pursuit Under the Moon. Beautiful Stranger, desu!
 Summer Angel! Barefoot Fairy, desunon!
 The Power Disappears! Threat Draws Near, desu!
 Capitals Under Assault! The Evil Gorgeous, desu!
 The Ultimate Battle: Good Against Evil, desu!
 Mega-Burst Space Adventure, desu!

Reception
Carlos Ross of THEM Anime Reviews called the series a "silly fantasy" and a "genuine fan-service anime."

Further reading

See also
Orguss

References

External links

1993 Japanese novels
1995 manga
1996 anime OVAs
1997 anime television series debuts
1998 anime films
Central Park Media
Fujimi Shobo manga
Isekai anime and manga
Isekai novels and light novels
J.C.Staff
Kadokawa Sneaker Bunko
Kadokawa Dwango franchises
Light novels
Satoru Akahori
Shōnen manga
TV Tokyo original programming